Claude R. Engle III is an American electrical engineer and internationally known lighting consultant, who has designed lighting schemes for many notable structures including the Reichstag and the Louvre.

Life
Engle attended Princeton University, attaining a BSEE in 1960. He is a Registered Professional Engineer. Prior to entering private practice he worked in New York City in the design of theatrical and television lighting.

Engle is past chairman of the Capital Section of the Illuminating Engineering Society (IES) and was a member of the faculty at Princeton University School of Architecture and Urban Planning. He has been a judge of the IES National Lighting Competition and a member of the American Institute of Architects Jury for interior design for Houston, Texas and Los Angeles.

Works
 U.S. Pavilion, Expo '67, Montreal, Canada (1967)
 World Bank, Washington, D.C. (1968)
 Cathedral of the Holy Name, Chicago, Illinois (1969)
 Chicago Transit Authority, Chicago, 1970
 Pennzoil Plaza, Houston, Texas, 1972
 World Trade Center, New York City, 1973
 Australian Embassy, Paris, 1974
 Temple Beth El, Detroit, Michigan, 1974
 MGIC Center, Milwaukee, Wisconsin, 1974
 Sears Tower, Chicago, 1975
 Avery Fisher Hall, Lincoln Center, New York City, 1975
 Centre Georges Pompidou, Paris, 1976
 Washington Mall, Washington, D.C., 1976
 Roy Thomson Hall, Toronto, Canada, 1976
 National Gallery of Art East Wing, Washington, D.C., 1976
 Sainsbury Centre for the Visual Arts, University of East Anglia, England, 1976
 Crystal Cathedral, Garden Grove, California, 1977
 Water Tower Place, Chicago, 1977
 Kennedy Center for Performing Arts Terrace Theater, Washington, D.C., 1978
 A.T. & T. Corporate Headquarters, New York City, 1979
 Orchestra Hall, Chicago, 1980
 Vietnam Veterans Memorial, Washington, D.C., 1982
 Fragrant Hill Hotel, Beijing, China, 1982
 Waverly Civic Center, Victoria, Australia, 1982
 The Regent Hotel, Hong Kong, 1983
 Riverside Centre, Brisbane, Australia, 1983
 McDonald's Corporation Headquarters Training Center, Oak Brook, Illinois, 1983
 Cleveland Play House (Philip Johnson addition), Cleveland, Ohio, 1983
 Hong Kong Club, Hong Kong, 1984
 Fogg Art Museum Sackler Gallery, Boston, 1984
 Exchange Square, Hong Kong, 1985
 I.B.M. Tower, Atlanta, 1985
 Transco Tower, Houston, 1985
 Hong Kong Shanghai Bank, Hong Kong, 1986
 Art Institute of Chicago, Chicago, 1986
 QVI Office Tower, Perth, Australia, 1987
 Grand Louvre, Paris, 1989
 Vitra Design Museum, Weil am Rhein, Germany, 1990
 Century Tower, Tokyo, 1990
 Stansted Airport Terminal, Stansted, England, 1991
 Bilbao Metro, Bilbao, Spain, 1992
 Carre d'Art de Nîmes, Nîmes, France, 1993
 Freer Gallery of Art, Washington, D.C., 1993
 Grand Louvre, Aile Richelieu, Paris, 1993
 Business Promotion Center, Duisburg, Germany, 1993
 Corning Glass Museum, Corning, New York, 1994
 Joslyn Museum, Omaha, 1994
 Tokyo International Forum, Tokyo, 1996
 United States Court of Appeals, San Francisco, 1996
 Repsol Service Station, Madrid, 1997
 Valencia Congress Center, Valencia, Spain, 1998
 Reichstag, Berlin, 1999
 Queen Elizabeth II Great Court, British Museum, London, 1999
 Canary Wharf tube station, Jubilee Line Extension, London, 1999
 San Francisco International Airport, 2001
 Millennium Bridge, London, 2002
 Dumbarton Oaks Courtyard Gallery, Washington, 2002
 Greater London Authority, 2002
 Paragon Research and Development Centre, Surrey, England, 2003
 Clark Center, Stanford University, 2003
 Mercado de Colon, Valencia, Spain 2004
 Cathedral of Light, Oakland, California, 2004
 Leslie L. Dan Pharmacy Building, University of Toronto, 2006

Publications
 "Technique*of*Lighting*the*Stage"
 "Color*and*Its*Part*in*Stage*Lighting"
 "Methods*of*Stage*Lighting*Controls"
 "Evaluation*of*Dimmer*Characteristics*for*Incandescent*Lighting"
 "Sunscoop"
 "Light*and*Space"

References

External links
 Claude R. Engle's official website

Year of birth missing (living people)
Living people
Princeton University School of Engineering and Applied Science alumni
Princeton University faculty
American interior designers
American electrical engineers
American lighting designers
Lighting engineers